Oenopota sagamiana is a species of sea snail, a marine gastropod mollusk in the family Mangeliidae.

Description

Distribution
This marine species was found off Hatsushima, Sagami Bay, Japan.

References

 Okutani, T. & Fujikura, K. 1992. A new turrid gastropod associated with metachromatic seabed near the Calyptogena-community in Sagami Bay. Venus (Japanese Journal of Malacology) 51: 1–7. 
 Sasaki, Takenori, Takashi Okutani, and Katsunori Fujikura. "Molluscs from hydrothermal vents and cold seeps in Japan: a review of taxa recorded in twenty recent years (1984–2004)." Venus 64.3–4 (2005): 87–133

External links
  Tucker, J.K. 2004 Catalog of recent and fossil turrids (Mollusca: Gastropoda). Zootaxa 682:1–1295.

sagamiana
Gastropods described in 1992